Bryophacis is a genus of beetles belonging to the family Staphylinidae.

The species of this genus are found in Europe and Northern America.

Species:
 Bryophacis arcticus Campbell, 1993 
 Bryophacis biseriatus (Mannerheim, 1846)

References

Staphylinidae
Staphylinidae genera